The Happy Capsize is a five-set, satirical play by Norwegian-Danish playwright Ludvig Holberg from 1754.

Production history
Det lykkelige Skibbrud premiered at the Royal Danish Theatre on 3 January 1754. It was performed 84 times in the period 1748-1889 and 113 times in the period 1889-1975.

References

External links

1754 plays
Plays by Ludvig Holberg